Meritocracy (merit, from Latin , and -cracy, from Ancient Greek   'strength, power') is the notion of a political system in which economic goods or political power are vested in individual people based on talent, effort, and achievement, rather than wealth or social class. Advancement in such a system is based on performance, as measured through examination or demonstrated achievement. Although the concept of meritocracy has existed for centuries, the first known use of the term was by sociologist Alan Fox in the journal Socialist Commentary in 1956. It was then popularized by sociologist Michael Dunlop Young, who used the term in his dystopian political and satirical book The Rise of the Meritocracy in 1958. Today, the term is often utilised to refer to social systems, in which personal advancement and success are primarily attributed to an individual´s capabilities and merits.

Conceptions

Early conceptions
Meritocracy was most famously argued by Plato in his book The Republic and stood to become one of the foundations of politics in the Western world. However, several scholars point out that the concept of meritocracy initially emerged in Asia. In his book The Eastern Origins of Western Civilisation, John M. Hobson argues that the concept of merit originated in China and became known to the West through Confucian texts.

The "most common definition of meritocracy conceptualizes merit in terms of tested competency and ability, and most likely, as measured by IQ or standardized achievement tests". In government and other administrative systems, "meritocracy" refers to a system under which advancement within the system turns on "merits", like performance, intelligence, credentials, and education. These are often determined through evaluations or examinations.

In a more general sense, meritocracy can refer to any form of evaluation based on achievement. Like "utilitarian" and "pragmatic", the word "meritocratic" has also developed a broader connotation, and is sometimes used to refer to any government run by "a ruling or influential class of educated or able people".

This is in contrast to the original, condemnatory use of the term in 1958 by Michael Dunlop Young in his work The Rise of the Meritocracy, who was satirizing the ostensibly merit-based Tripartite System of education practiced in the United Kingdom at the time; he claimed that, in the Tripartite System, "merit is equated with intelligence-plus-effort, its possessors are identified at an early age and selected for appropriate intensive education, and there is an obsession with quantification, test-scoring, and qualifications".

Meritocracy in its wider sense, may be any general act of judgment upon the basis of various demonstrated merits; such acts frequently are described in sociology and psychology.

In rhetoric, the demonstration of one's merit regarding mastery of a particular subject is an essential task most directly related to the Aristotelian term Ethos. The equivalent Aristotelian conception of meritocracy is based upon aristocratic or oligarchic structures, rather than in the context of the modern state.

More recent conceptions
To this day, the origin of the term meritocracy is widely attributed to the British sociologist Michael Young, who used it pejoratively in his book The Rise of the Meritocracy. For Young, merit is defined as intelligence plus effort. As a result, he portrays a fictional meritocratic society as a dystopia, in which social stratification is based solely on intelligence and individual merit, which creates a highly competitive and unequal society.

Despite, this initial negative connotation, the term meritocracy has gained some positive recognition more recently. As such, it is nowadays applied to merit-based systems of status and reward allocation in distinction to aristocratic or class-based systems, in which inherited factors are the primary determinant for the position of an individual in society. 

Yet, the concept of meritocracy as a social system has also attracted much criticism. In light of the rising social inequality in the 21st century, scholars have labelled meritocracy a political ideology and an illusion. As Thomas Piketty notes in his book Capital in the Twenty-First Century "our democratic societies rest on a meritocratic worldview". Accordingly, restricted mobility and the significance of inherited wealth co-exist with the belief in a meritocratic system. Consequently, "the idea of meritocracy has become a key means of cultural legitimation for contemporary capitalist culture", in which wealth and income inequalities are being perpetuated and reproduced. This is supported by recent research which shows that, the more unequal a society, the higher the tendency of members of that society to attribute success to meritocracy rather than non-meritocratic variables such as inherited wealth.

This illustrates that the contemporary conception of meritocracy is at least twofold. On the one hand, it describes a social system based on the notion that individuals are rewarded and advance in society as a result of their talent and effort. This conception presupposes social mobility and equality of opportunity. On the other hand, meritocracy can be understood as an ideological discourse grounded in different belief systems, that manifest themselves in different forms such as social democratic and neoliberal conceptions of meritocracy.

The most common form of meritocratic screening found today is the college degree. Higher education is an imperfect meritocratic screening system for various reasons, such as lack of uniform standards worldwide, lack of scope (not all occupations and processes are included), and lack of access (some talented people never have an opportunity to participate because of the expense, most especially in developing countries). Nonetheless, academic degrees serve some amount of meritocratic screening purpose in the absence of a more refined methodology. Education alone, however, does not constitute a complete system, as meritocracy must automatically confer power and authority, which a degree does not accomplish independently.

Etymology
Although the concept has existed for centuries, the term "meritocracy" is relatively new. It was first used pejoratively by sociologist Alan Fox in 1956, and then by British politician and sociologist Michael Dunlop Young in his 1958 satirical essay The Rise of the Meritocracy. Young's essay pictured the United Kingdom under the rule of a government favouring intelligence and aptitude (merit) above all else, being the combination of the root of Latin origin "merit" (from "mereō" meaning "earn") and the Ancient Greek suffix "-cracy" (meaning "power", "rule"). The purely Greek word is axiocracy (αξιοκρατία), from axios (αξιος, worthy) + "-cracy" (-κρατία, power).
In this book the term had distinctly negative connotations as Young questioned both the legitimacy of the selection process used to become a member of this elite and the outcomes of being ruled by such a narrowly defined group.
The essay, written in the first person by a fictional historical narrator in 2034, interweaves history from the politics of pre- and post-war Britain with those of fictional future events in the short (1960 onward) and long term (2020 onward).

The essay was based upon the tendency of the then-current governments, in their striving toward intelligence, to ignore shortcomings and upon the failure of education systems to utilize correctly the gifted and talented members within their societies.

Young's fictional narrator explains that, on the one hand, the greatest contributor to society is not the "stolid mass" or majority, but the "creative minority" or members of the "restless elite". On the other hand, he claims that there are casualties of progress whose influence is underestimated and that, from such stolid adherence to natural science and intelligence, arises arrogance and complacency. This problem is encapsulated in the phrase "Every selection of one is a rejection of many".

It was also used by Hannah Arendt in her essay "Crisis in Education", which was written in 1958 and refers to the use of meritocracy in the English educational system. She too uses the term pejoratively. It was not until 1972 that Daniel Bell used the term positively.
M. Young's formula to describe meritocracy is: m = IQ + E. The formula of L. Ieva instead is: m = f (IQ, Cut, ex) + E. That is, for Young, meritocracy is the sum of intelligence and energy; while, for Ieva it is represented by the function between intelligence, culture and experience, to which energy is then added.

History

Imperial China

Some of the earliest example of an administrative meritocracy, based on civil service examinations, dates back to Ancient China. The concept originates, at least by the sixth century BC, when it was advocated by the Chinese philosopher Confucius, who "invented the notion that those who govern should do so because of merit, not of inherited status. This sets in motion the creation of the imperial examinations and bureaucracies open only to those who passed tests".

As the Qin and Han dynasties developed a meritocratic system in order to maintain power over a large, sprawling empire, it became necessary for the government to maintain a complex network of officials. Prospective officials could come from a rural background and government positions were not restricted to the nobility. Rank was determined by merit, through the civil service examinations, and education became the key for social mobility. After the fall of the Han dynasty, the nine-rank system was established during the Three Kingdoms period.

According to the Princeton Encyclopedia of American History:

Ancient Greece
Both Plato and Aristotle advocated meritocracy, Plato in his The Republic, arguing that the wisest should rule, and hence the rulers should be philosopher kings.

17th century
The concept of meritocracy spread from China to British India during the seventeenth century.

The first European power to implement a successful meritocratic civil service was the British Empire, in their administration of India: "company managers hired and promoted employees based on competitive examinations in order to prevent corruption and favoritism". British colonial administrators advocated the spread of the system to the rest of the Commonwealth, the most "persistent" of which was Thomas Taylor Meadows, Britain's consul in Guangzhou, China. Meadows successfully argued in his Desultory Notes on the Government and People of China, published in 1847, that "the long duration of the Chinese empire is solely and altogether owing to the good government which consists in the advancement of men of talent and merit only", and that the British must reform their civil service by making the institution meritocratic. This practice later was adopted in the late nineteenth century by the British mainland, inspired by the "Chinese mandarin system".

The British philosopher and polymath John Stuart Mill advocated meritocracy in his book Considerations on Representative Government. His model was to give more votes to the more educated voter. His views are explained in Estlund (2003:57–58):

Mill's proposal of plural voting has two motives. One is to prevent one group or class of people from being able to control the political process even without having to give reasons in order to gain sufficient support. He calls this the problem of class legislation. Since the most numerous class is also at a lower level of education and social rank, this could be partly remedied by giving those at the higher ranks plural votes. A second, and equally prominent motive for plural voting is to avoid giving equal influence to each person without regard to their merit, intelligence, etc. He thinks that it is fundamentally important that political institutions embody, in their spirit, the recognition that some opinions are worth more than others. He does not say that this is a route to producing better political decisions, but it is hard to understand his argument, based on this second motive, in any other way.

So, if Aristotle is right that the deliberation is best if participants are numerous (and assuming for simplicity that the voters are the deliberators) then this is a reason for giving all or many citizens a vote, but this does not yet show that the wiser subset should not have, say, two or three; in that way something would be given both to the value of the diverse perspectives, and to the value of the greater wisdom of the few. This combination of the Platonic and Aristotelian points is part of what I think is so formidable about Mill's proposal of plural voting. It is also an advantage of his view that he proposes to privilege not the wise, but the educated. Even if we agreed that the wise should rule, there is a serious problem about how to identify them. This becomes especially important if a successful political justification must be generally acceptable to the ruled. In that case, privileging the wise would require not only their being so wise as to be better rulers, but also, and more demandingly, that their wisdom be something that can be agreed to by all reasonable citizens. I turn to this conception of justification below.

Mill's position has great plausibility: good education promotes the ability of citizens to rule more wisely. So, how can we deny that the educated subset would rule more wisely than others? But then why shouldn't they have more votes?

Estlund goes on to criticize Mill's education-based meritocracy on various grounds.

18th century: West Africa
The Ashanti King Osei Kwadwo who ruled from c. 1764 to 1777, began the meritocratic system of appointing central officials according to their ability, rather than their birth.

19th century
In the United States, the federal bureaucracy used the spoils system from 1828 until the assassination of United States President James A. Garfield by a disappointed office seeker in 1881 proved its dangers. Two years later in 1883, the system of appointments to the United States Federal Bureaucracy was revamped by the Pendleton Civil Service Reform Act, partially based on the British meritocratic civil service that had been established years earlier. The act stipulated that government jobs should be awarded on the basis of merit, through competitive exams, rather than ties to politicians or political affiliation. It also made it illegal to fire or demote government employees for political reasons.

To enforce the merit system and the judicial system, the law also created the United States Civil Service Commission. In the modern American meritocracy, the president may hand out only a certain number of jobs, which must be approved by the United States Senate.

Australia began establishing public universities in the 1850s with the goal of promoting meritocracy by providing advanced training and credentials. The educational system was set up to service urban males of middle-class background, but of diverse social and religious origins. It was increasingly extended to all graduates of the public school system, those of rural and regional background, and then to women and finally to ethnic minorities. Both the middle classes and the working classes have promoted the ideal of meritocracy within a strong commitment to "mate-ship" and political equality.

20th century to today
Singapore describes meritocracy as one of its official guiding principles for domestic public policy formulation, placing emphasis on academic credentials as objective measures of merit.

There is criticism that, under this system, Singaporean society is being increasingly stratified and that an elite class is being created from a narrow segment of the population. Singapore has a growing level of tutoring for children, and top tutors are often paid better than school teachers. Defenders of this system recall the ancient Chinese proverb "Wealth never survives past three generations", suggesting that the nepotism or cronyism of elitists eventually will be, and often are, limited by those lower down the hierarchy.

Singaporean academics are continuously re-examining the application of meritocracy as an ideological tool and how it's stretched to encompass the ruling party's objectives. Professor Kenneth Paul Tan at the Lee Kuan Yew School of Public Policy asserts that "meritocracy, in trying to 'isolate' merit by treating people with fundamentally unequal backgrounds as superficially the same, can be a practice that ignores and even conceals the real advantages and disadvantages that are unevenly distributed to different segments of an inherently unequal society, a practice that in fact perpetuates this fundamental inequality. In this way, those who are picked by meritocracy as having merit may already have enjoyed unfair advantages from the very beginning, ignored according to the principle of nondiscrimination".

How meritocracy in the Singaporean context relates to the application of pragmatism as an ideological device, which combines strict adherence to market principles without any aversion to social engineering and little propensity for classical social welfarism, is further illustrated by Kenneth Paul Tan in subsequent articles:

There is a strong ideological quality in Singapore's pragmatism, and a strongly pragmatic quality in ideological negotiations within the dynamics of hegemony. In this complex relationship, the combination of ideological and pragmatic maneuvering over the decades has resulted in the historical dominance of government by the PAP in partnership with global capital whose interests have been advanced without much reservation.Within the Ecuadorian Ministry of Labor, the Ecuadorian Meritocracy Institute was created under the technical advice of the Singaporean government.

With similar objections, John Rawls rejects the ideal of meritocracy as well.

Criticism

The Meritocracy Trap
In book, "The Meritocracy Trap", Daniel Markovits poses that meritocracy is responsible for the exacerbation of social stratification, to the detriment of much of the general population. He introduces the idea of "snowball inequality", a perpetually widening gap between elite workers and members of the middle class. While the elite obtain exclusive positions thanks to their wealth of demonstrated merit, they occupy jobs and oust middle class workers from the core of economic events. The elites use their high earnings to secure the best education for their own children, so that they may enter the world of work with a competitive advantage over those who did not have the same opportunities. Thus, the cycle continues with each generation

In this case, the middle class suffers decreased opportunities for individual prosperity and financial success. While it is impossible to quantify the exact effects of this social divide on the middle class, the opioid epidemic, dramatic rises in "deaths of despair" (suicides, mental health and alcoholism), and lowering life expectancy in these meritocratic societies are often listed as results of it. It is not only the middle class who suffer the negative effects of meritocracy, however. The societal elite have to pay a significant price for their hectic working life. Many admit suffering from physical and mental health issues, inability to sustain a good quality personal life and a lack of time spent with their families. Children of the social elite are often forced into a highly competitive educational environment from a young age, which continues throughout school, university, and into their work life. Through this argument, the author attacks the idea of a meritocracy as a fair means to evaluate and reward the most skilled and hard-working members of society.

Markovits proposes a different approach to meritocracy, one where socioeconomic life conveniences are freely distributed to the people who are sufficiently successful at the things they are doing rather than creating an environment of ongoing competition. He calls for reform of economic roles, organizations and institutions in order to include a wider population and hence narrow the increasing inequality gap by questioning the social hegemony of high-profile workers, and intervening with redistribution of earnings, working hours and social identity on behalf of middle class workers.

"The Tyranny of Merit"
In his book The Tyranny of Merit: What's Become of the Common Good?, the American political philosopher Michael Sandel argues that the meritocratic ideal has become a moral and political problem for contemporary Western societies. He contends that the meritocratic belief that personal success is solely based on individual merit and effort has led to a neglection of the common good, the erosion of solidarity, and the rise of inequality. Sandel´s criticism concerns the widespread notion that those who achieve success deserve it because of their intelligence, talent and effort. Instead, he argues that this belief is flawed since it ignores the role of luck and external circumstances, such as social and external factors, which are beyond an individual's control. 

As a consequence, Sandel attributes the increasing gap between economic "winners and losers", the decline of civic engagement and the rise of populism to the meritocratic ideal. In addition, he argues that the promise of meritocracy creates an elite that is disconnected from society and lacks empathy for those, who are left behind. Elite institutions including the Ivy League and Wall Street have corrupted the virtue, according to Sandel, and the sense of who deserves power.

Ultimately, the argument of Michael Sandel is that "meritocracy today functions less as an alternative to inequality than as its primary justification". Thus, he makes the case for a reconsideration of our understanding of success and the common good including public debates regarding the extent of the welfare state. According to Sandel, this entails a deliberation about what constitutes a contribution to the common good and how these ought to be rewarded. Hence, he appeals to move beyond distributive justice towards contributive justice, that is "creating conditions to enable everyone to contribute to the common good and to receive honor and recognition for having done so". To this end, he suggest public policies such as more progressive taxation to reduce economic inequalities.

Impracticality

The term "meritocracy" was originally intended as a negative concept. One of the primary concerns with meritocracy is the unclear definition of "merit". What is considered as meritorious can differ with opinions as on which qualities are considered the most worthy, raising the question of which "merit" is the highest—or, in other words, which standard is the "best" standard. As the supposed effectiveness of a meritocracy is based on the supposed competence of its officials, this standard of merit cannot be arbitrary and has to also reflect the competencies required for their roles.

The reliability of the authority and system that assesses each individual's merit is another point of concern. As a meritocratic system relies on a standard of merit to measure and compare people against, the system by which this is done has to be reliable to ensure that their assessed merit accurately reflects their potential capabilities. Standardized testing, which reflects the meritocratic sorting process, has come under criticism for being rigid and unable to accurately assess many valuable qualities and potentials of students. Education theorist Bill Ayers, commenting on the limitations of standardized testing, writes that "standardized tests can't measure initiative, creativity, imagination, conceptual thinking, curiosity, effort, irony, judgment, commitment, nuance, good will, ethical reflection, or a host of other valuable dispositions and attributes. What they can measure and count are isolated skills, specific facts and function, content knowledge, the least interesting and least significant aspects of learning". Merit determined through the opinionated evaluations of teachers, while being able to assess the valuable qualities that cannot be assessed by standardized testing, are unreliable as the opinions, insights, biases, and standards of the teachers vary greatly. If the system of evaluation is corrupt, non-transparent, opinionated or misguided, decisions regarding who has the highest merit can be highly fallible.

The level of education required in order to become competitive in a meritocracy may also be costly, effectively limiting candidacy for a position of power to those with the means necessary to become educated. An example of this was Chinese student self-declared messiah, Hong Xiuquan, who despite ranking first in a preliminary, nationwide imperial examination, was unable to afford further education. As such, although he did try to study in private, Hong was ultimately noncompetitive in later examinations and unable to become a bureaucrat. This economic aspect of meritocracies has been said to continue nowadays in countries without free educations, with the Supreme Court of the United States, for example, consisting only of justices who attended Harvard or Yale and generally only considering clerkship candidates who attended a top-five university, while in the 1950s the two universities only accounted for around one fifth of the justices. Even if free education were provided, the resources that the parents of a student are able to provide outside of the curriculum, such as tutoring, exam preparation, and financial support for living costs during higher education will influence the education the student attains and the student's social position in a meritocratic society. This limits the fairness and justness of any meritocratic system. Similarly, feminist critics have noted that many hierarchical organisations actually favour individuals who have received disproportionate support of an informal kind (e.g. mentorship, word-of-mouth opportunities, and so on), such that only those who benefit from such supports are likely to understand these organisations as meritocratic.

Cornell University economist Robert H. Frank rejects meritocracy in his book Success and Luck: Good Fortune and the Myth of Meritocracy. He describes how chance plays a significant role in deciding who gets what that is not objectively based on merit. He does not discount the importance of hard work, but, using psychological studies, mathematical formulae, and examples, demonstrates that among groups of people performing at a high level, chance (luck) plays an enormous role in an individual's success.

Undesirable outcomes
Another concern regards the principle of incompetence, or the "Peter Principle". As people rise in a meritocratic society through the social hierarchy through their demonstrated merit, they eventually reach, and become stuck, at a level too difficult for them to perform effectively; they are promoted to incompetence. This reduces the effectiveness of a meritocratic system, the supposed main practical benefit of which is the competence of those who run the society.

In his book Meritocratic Education and Social Worthlessness (Palgrave, 2012), the philosopher Khen Lampert argued that educational meritocracy is nothing but a post-modern version of Social Darwinism. Its proponents argue that the theory justifies social inequality as being meritocratic. This social theory holds that Darwin's theory of evolution by natural selection is a model, not only for the development of biological traits in a population, but also as an application for human social institutions—the existing social institutions being implicitly declared as normative. Social Darwinism shares its roots with early progressivism, and was most popular from the late nineteenth century to the end of World War II. Darwin only ventured to propound his theories in a biological sense, and it is other thinkers and theorists who have applied Darwin's model normatively to unequal endowments of human ambitions.

Harvard philosopher Michael Sandel in his latest book makes a case against meritocracy, calling it a "tyranny". Ongoing stalled social mobility and increasing inequality are laying bare the crass delusion of the American Dream, and the promise "you can make it if you want and try". The latter, according to Sandel, is the main culprit of the anger and frustration which brought some Western countries towards populism.

School meritocracy
School meritocracy is the belief that hard work leads to success. Research shows that teachers give better grades and value a lot more children who explain their problems or their behaviour with inner explanations (like the amount of efforts they gave), than those who give environmental or factual explanations (like predispositions or family background). Moreover, pupils who want to show a good image of themselves will prefer explaining their success or failures with inner characteristics rather than with external facts. 

However, social classes and sex are other important factors which explain academic success, merit being only one of the determining aspects. 
Education system has two functions: one is to educate, and the other is to select. Indeed, in occidental societies, the education system assigns occupations to students, occupations that are very different in wealth, power, and position, through grades and diplomas that act as merit indicators. Students with very good degrees will be directed to high status jobs and students with lower degrees or no degree at all will be directed to low status jobs. As a result, one’s future depends entirely on one’s success or failure during school career, which itself depends, according to school meritocracy, on its own efforts to make it a success. School meritocracy is also linked with favouritism and with group membership.

However, school career, grades and degrees depend a lot on group belonging (sex, being from privileged or unprivileged background) to the extent that growing up with less resources (computer, educated parents who can help with homework…) and less serenity, will penalise a pupil no matter how many efforts he or she makes. 
It has also been discovered that the more a woman tend to believe in meritocracy, the less they would reject system explanations about men’s superiority. Believing in meritocracy is sometimes a bias, as some scientific results from studies showed that participants would work harder when they were told that success on the task was due to luck, for instance. They would also value much more one study among similar ones, based on meritocracy believes. 

There are two different types of meritocracy:
- Prescriptive meritocracy: how people think the system should work.
- Descriptive meritocracy: how people think the system actually works.

The belief in school meritocracy (BSM) is a way to justify the social order. It is linked to the theory of social reproduction. High status group members are better off than low status group members who are disadvantaged by the hierarchies. Justifying the status by school meritocracy is a way to legitimize their position. However, school meritocracy is also a positive belief to the extent that it promotes the idea of social mobility and the fact that when one has a strong will, one can reach any status. This fact makes students from lower status groups more dependent to the meritocratic belief than students from the higher status groups, because it represents their probability to reach a higher status group. Therefore, it has been shown they can end up agreeing more in school meritocracy.

See also
 Achievement ideology
 Civil service entrance examination
 Differential Education Achievement
 Educational entrance examination
 Elitism
 Equality of opportunity
 Equality of outcome
 Merit (Buddhism)
 Merit (Christianity)
 Ownership society
 Social mobility
 Technocracy

Notes

References

Further reading

 Burbank, Jane and Cooper, Frederick. (2010). Empires in World History: Power and the Politics of Difference. Princeton: Princeton University Press. .
 Kazin, Michael, Edwards, Rebecca, and Rothman, Adam. (2010). The Princeton Encyclopedia of American Political History Volume 2. Princeton University Press. .
 Kett, Joseph F. Merit: The History of a Founding Ideal From the American Revolution to the Twenty-First Century. Ithaca, NY: Cornell University Press, 2012. 
 Lampert, Khen. Meritocratic Education and Social Worthlessness, Palgrave-Macmillan, UK, 24 December 2012; 
 Mulligan, Thomas. (2018). Justice and the Meritocratic State. New York: Routledge. . 
 Schwarz, Bill. (1996). The expansion of England: race, ethnicity and cultural history. Psychology Pres. .
 Ieva, Lorenzo. (2018). Fondamenti di meritocrazia. Rome: Europa edizioni. .
 Sandel, Michael.

External links

 

 

Affirmative action
Liberalism
Political neologisms
Political philosophy
Rule by a subset of population
Social philosophy
Socio-economic mobility